2016 Vegalta Sendai season.

J1 League

Honours

Stadium grass best condition award 
Sendai Stadium

References

External links
 J.League official site

Vegalta Sendai
Vegalta Sendai seasons